The Treaty of Friendship and Cooperation between Spain and Portugal (Spanish: Tratado de Amistad y Cooperación entre España y Portugal, Portuguese: Tratado de Amizade e Cooperação entre Portugal e Espanha) is a bilateral treaty of friendship signed between Spain and Portugal on 22 November 1977. It was ratified on 17 April 1978 in Portugal and on 25 April 1978 in Spain. Its stated goals were to strengthen the bonds of friendship and solidarity between the two countries. It was signed by Portuguese Prime Minister Mário Soares and Spanish Prime Minister Adolfo Suárez.

The treaty replaced the Iberian Pact signed in 1942, and followed both countries' transitions into democracies, after the Carnation Revolution in Portugal and the 1977 Spanish general election.

See also 
Portugal–Spain relations

External links 
British Pathe video of signing

References 

Treaties of Spain
Treaties of Portugal
Portugal–Spain relations
1977 in Spain
1977 in Portugal
Treaties concluded in 1977
Treaties entered into force in 1978